The Big Sport of Turfdom Award has been given annually by the Turf Publicists of America since 1966 to a person or group who enhances coverage of Thoroughbred racing through cooperation with the media and Thoroughbred racing publicists.

The Turf Publicists of America, founded in 1951, is made up of  approximately 180 Thoroughbred racing publicists and marketing executives at various racetracks throughout North America with the shared goal of promoting the sport of Thoroughbred racing.

2022 - Cody Dorman, namesake of Cody's Wish
2021 - Brad Cox
2020 - Tom Amoss
2019 - Mark Casse
2018 - John Asher
2017 - Penny Chenery
2016 – Art Sherman
2015 – Team American Pharoah: Zayat Stables, Bob Baffert, Victor Espinoza
2014 – Tom Durkin
2013 – Gary Stevens
2012 – Dale Romans
2011 – H. Graham Motion
2010 – Mike E. Smith
2009 – Team Zenyatta: Ann & Jerry Moss, John Shirreffs, Dottie Shirreffs, Mike E. Smith
2008 – J. Larry Jones
2007 – Carl Nafzger
2006 – Dr. Dean Richardson
2005 – Pat Day
2004 – John Servis
2003 – Sackatoga Stable
2002 – Ken and Sue McPeek
2001 – Laura Hillenbrand 
2000 – Laffit Pincay Jr.
1999 – D. Wayne Lukas
1998 – Michael E. Pegram
1997 – Bob Baffert
1996 – Team Cigar: Allen E. Paulson, William I. Mott, Jerry Bailey
1995 – Robert and Beverly Lewis
1994 – Warren A. Croll Jr.
1993 – Chris McCarron
1992 – Ángel Cordero Jr.
1991 – Hammer and Oaktown Stable 
1990 – Carl Nafzger
1989 – Tim Conway
1988 – Julie Krone
1987 – Jack Van Berg
1986 – Jim McKay
1985 – Laffit Pincay Jr.	
1984 – John Henry
1983 – Joe Hirsch
1982 – Woody Stephens
1981 – John Forsythe
1980 – Jack Klugman
1979 – Laz Barrera
1978 – Ron Turcotte
1977 – Steve Cauthen 
1976 – Telly Savalas 
1975 – Francis P. Dunne 
1974 – Eddie Arcaro
1973 – Penny Chenery
1972 – John W. Galbreath 
1971 – Burt Bacharach
1970 – Saul Rosen (jockey) 
1969 – Bill Shoemaker 
1968 – John A. Nerud
1967 – Allaire du Pont 
1966 – E.P. Taylor

References

Turf Publicists of America website

Horse racing awards